Lower Boro is a locality in the Goulburn Mulwaree Council area, New South Wales, Australia. It is located about 16 km southeast of Tarago. The link from Tarago to Windellama, which is part of a link from Canberra to Nerriga and Nowra, passes through the northern part of the locality.

Heritage listings
Lower Boro has a number of heritage-listed sites, including:
 Mayfield Road: Mayfield

References

Localities in New South Wales
Southern Tablelands
Goulburn Mulwaree Council